Juglans regia 'Zijing' is a cultivar of walnut developed in Beijing, China, expanded breeding upon the basis of the mother trees of Purple Leaved Walnut, which was founded in the depths of mountains, Qingshui, Mentougou District, Beijing in 1998.
Juglans regia Zijing is cultivated by Wang Xiupo.  On 17 October 2017, Wang obtained the certificate of plant variety rights from the State Forestry Administration of China. Because of the Juglans regia Zijing's trees have five major features of purple branches, purple female flowers, purple leaves, purple peel and purple walnut kernels, they are also called Wuzi Walnut (五紫核桃). The trees of Juglans regia Zijing's are mainly distributed in Beijing International Walnut Manor currently.

Main values
Landscape agriculture
Military and furniture items
Road greening protection

Growing environment

Growing at an altitude of about 800 meters above the hillside zones, Juglans regia Zijing's trees have strong resistance and adaptability as well as ornamental value, adapted to temperate climatatic regions. 

Flowering takes place in May of Northern Hemisphere,fruiting in September.

Planting methods

Gardens selection
Juglans regia Zijing's trees are resistant, adaptable, and have ornamental value. They can be planted and cultivated in Temperate climate regions. Owing to the fact that the Walnuts are light preferring plants, it is better to choose the south slope when building a garden in the mountains in the Northern Hemisphere.

Planting management
The planting time of Juglans regia Zijing's trees is around the germination in late March of Northern Hemisphere. The survival rate of seedlings planted one to two years is higher. After planting, it should be irrigated with water, water and fertiliser management should be strengthened. Weeding should be performed frequently, and attention has to be paid to drainage Juglans regia Zijing during the rainy season. On the other hand, attention has to be paid to the prevention of pests and diseases from June to July of the Northern Hemisphere.

Planting and cultivation

Scion collection 
Select the developing branches and collect the annual branches without pests in the mid-March of the Northern Hemisphere for the scion.

Grafting time 
Grafting time is appropriate from the end of May to the beginning of July in the Northern Hemisphere.

Bacterial root rot
Bacterial nuclear root rot, caused by Sclerotinia sclerotiorum, makes seedling root and its lateral root cortex decay, resulting in the death of Juglans regia Zijing's trees in part or in whole. The prevention and treatment methods are to select the nursery lands, dry up the soil, disinfect seeds and improve the soil.

References 

Juglans
Food plant cultivars